The St George Golf Club in St George, Queensland, Australia, is an 18-hole sand green course established in 1948. Located in the Shire of Balonne, St Georges Golf Club is located 513 Kilometers west of Brisbane.

References

1948 establishments in Australia
Sports clubs established in 1948
Sports venues completed in 1948
Golf clubs and courses in Queensland
St George, Queensland